Elizabeth Alberta Tancock (February 22, 1911 – May 28, 2009), née Elizabeth Alberta Edwards, was a Canadian swimmer who competed in the Olympic games in 1932 in Los Angeles.

Biography
In 1932, she was a member of the Canadian relay team that finished fourth in the 4x100-metre freestyle relay. In the 400-metre freestyle, she was eliminated in the first round. She also represented Canada in the 1930 and 1934 British Empire Games. Tancock was inducted as a member of the University of Toronto Sports Hall of Fame in 1990. From 1962 to 1980 Tancock worked at administration at York University in Toronto. At the time of her death at the age of 98, on May 28, 2009, Tancock was believed to be Canada's oldest living Olympic competitor.

References

1911 births
2009 deaths
Canadian female freestyle swimmers
Commonwealth Games silver medallists for Canada
Olympic swimmers of Canada
Swimmers from Toronto
Swimmers at the 1932 Summer Olympics
Swimmers at the 1930 British Empire Games
Swimmers at the 1934 British Empire Games
Commonwealth Games medallists in swimming
Medallists at the 1930 British Empire Games